Haunted History is a 1998 UFA/Cafe Productions series exploring the supernatural. Executive Producer Ed Babbage for Cafe (London). The American version of the show also debuted in 1998 (as a special) with the same premise of exploring the world to investigate the "haunted history" of reportedly haunted locations.

Premise
Tell ghost stories related to famous people and events using a mixture of experts and dramatic reconstructions of both the supernatural events and the history underlying them.

Season One (UK)
Episode 1: Legacy of the Battle of Little Bighorn examines the ghost stories associated with Custer's Last Stand.
Episode 2: Echoes of an Earthly Hell: Perched on a craggy peninsula on the south coast of Tasmania are the ruins of the infamous Port Arthur Penal Settlement. Do psychic echoes reverberate here?
Episode 3: Ghosts of Slavery The Myrtles is a two-hundred-year-old Louisiana plantation house with a turbulent past. A ghost story from America's South.
Episode 4: The Witches Who Cannot Forget: The story of Matthew Hopkins, Witchfinder General and the Witch Trials, and the ghosts which are still said to linger.
Episode 5: Verdun: The Secret Battle Underground: claims of ghosts haunting tourists in the tunnels of the fortifications of this terrible First World War battle.
Episode 6: Mary Queen of Scots: The Tragic Queen: retells the tale of the tragic Queen and the many ghost stories today associated with her romantic life.

US version
Haunted History premiered as a special in October 1998. The series began on 26 October 1999 on the History Channel and ran until 11 August 2001. It was produced by Greystone Communications. The show featured haunted locations where ghosts have been reported from all over the United States, the United Kingdom and the Caribbean. It was executive produced by Craig Haffner and Donna E. Lusitana, and produced by Greg Goldman, Jim Lindsey, and Jonathan Moser, among others.

Opening: "Stories of the supernatural: fact or fiction? Through a veil of sightings and encounters, we catch a glimpse of our historical past on our journey through Haunted History."

Series overview

Haunted History Special

Haunted History episodes

Season 1 (1999–2000)

Season 2 (2001)

See also
 List of ghost films

References

Haunted History on The History Channel
Haunted History on TV.com

External links

Paranormal television
History (American TV channel) original programming
1998 American television series debuts
2001 American television series endings
1998 British television series debuts
2001 British television series endings
1990s American documentary television series
2000s American documentary television series
1990s British documentary television series
2000s British documentary television series